Barimo massacre refers to the massacre of 26 Bosniaks in Barimo, Višegrad in August 1992 by the Bosnian Serb Army. The victims were mostly women and children. The entire village was burnt down and destroyed, including religious buildings. The eldest victim was Hanka Halilović, born in 1900, and the youngest was Fadila Bajrić, born in 1980.

See also
 List of massacres in Bosnia and Herzegovina
 Višegrad
 Visegrad massacre
 Paklenik Massacre
 Bosanska Jagodina massacre
 Vilina Vlas
 Uzamnica camp
 Milan Lukić
 Željko Lelek
 Momir Savić

References

External links
Visegrad Genocide Memories

1992 in Bosnia and Herzegovina
Massacres in the Bosnian War
Massacres in 1992
Serbian war crimes in the Bosnian War
August 1992 events in Europe
Višegrad
Massacres of Bosniaks